Golsar (formerly, Seyfabad (Persian: سيف اباد), also Romanized as Seyfābād; also known as Seyfābād-e Pol-e Kordān) is a city in the Central District of Savojbolagh County, Alborz province, Iran. Golsar was created as a city out of two villages: Seyfabad-e Bozorg (Persian: سيف ابادخالصه, meaning Big Seyfabad) and Seyfabad-e Khaleseh (Persian: سيف ابادبزرگ, meaning Little Seyfabad). Their combined population in 2006 was 11,013 in 2,775 households. At the 2016 census, Golsar's population was 13,745.

References 

Savojbolagh County

Cities in Alborz Province

Populated places in Alborz Province

Populated places in Savojbolagh County